Horry is the surname of:

 Baby Boy Horry (2008–2008), a formerly unidentified deceased American baby
 Daniel Horry (c. 1747–1785), American Revolutionary War colonel and politician
 Elias Horry (1773–1834), American lawyer, politician, businessman and plantation owner
 George Cecil Horry (1907–1981), British-born New Zealand confidence trickster, tailor and convicted murderer
 Peter Horry (1743 or 1747–1815), American Revolutionary War militia leader and Horry County namesake
 Robert Horry (born 1970), American basketball player
 Thomas Stanley Horry (1898–1960), English First World War flying ace
 William Frederick Horry (1843–1872), English murderer